Lee Jin-hee may refer to:

Lee Jin-hee (field hockey)
Lee Jin-hee (bobsledder)
Lee Jin-hee (actress)